Fulvio is a given name. Notable people with the name include:

Andrea Fulvio (c. 1470 – 1527), Renaissance humanist, poet and antiquarian of Rome, advisor to Raphael
Fulvio de Assis (born 1981), Brazilian professional basketball player
Fulvio Bacchelli (born 1951), former Italian rally driver, won Rally New Zealand in 1977
Fulvio Balatti (1938–2001), Italian rower
Fulvio Ballabio (born 1954), race car driver born in Milan, Italy
Fulvio Bernardini (1905–1984), Italian professional footballer and coach
Fulvio Caccia (born 1952), contemporary Italian poet, novelist and essayist
Fulvio Caldini (born 1959), Italian composer, pianist, and musicologist
Fulvio Cecere (born 1960), Canadian actor
Fulvio Collovati (born 1957), Italian former footballer, who played defense
Fulvio Conti (born 1947), Italian financier
Fulvio Giulio della Corgna) (1517–1583), Tuscan Catholic bishop and cardinal
Fulvio Croce, (1901–1977), Italian lawyer killed by the terrorist association Red Brigades
Fulvio Dapit (born 1975), Italian male sky runner
Fulvio Falzarano, Italian actor
Fulvio Fantoni (born 1963), Italian international bridge player
Fulvio Flavoni (born 1970), Italian football goalkeeper
Fulvio Chester "Chet" Forte (1935–1996), American television director and sports radio talk show host
Fulvio Francesconi (born 1944), retired Italian professional footballer
Fulvio Galimi (1927–2016), Argentine fencer who practised foil, épée and sabre
Fulvio Lorigiola (born 1959), former Italian rugby union player, a current sports executive and a lawyer
Fulvio Lucisano (born 1928), Italian film producer
Fulvio Martini (1923–2003), Italian Navy admiral and intelligence officer
Fulvio Martusciello (born 1968), Italian politician, and a member of the European Parliament since 2014
Fulvio Melia (born 1956), Italian-American physicist/astrophysicist and author
Fulvio Mingozzi, Italian actor
Fulvio Miyata (born 1977), Brazilian judoka
Fulvio Nesti (1925–1996), Italian footballer
Fulvio Orsini (1529–1600), Italian humanist, historian, and archaeologist
Fulvio Palmieri (1903–1966), Italian screenwriter
Fulvio Pea (born 1967), Italian football coach
Fulvio Pelli (born 1951), Swiss politician
Fulvio Pennacchi (1905–1992), Italian-Brazilian artist in drawing, painting, mural painting and ceramic
Fulvio Rocchi (born 1909), Argentine sports shooter
Fulvio Roiter (1926–2016), Italian photographer
Fulvio Saini (born 1962), Italian football midfield
Fulvio Scola (born 1982), Italian cross country skier
Fulvio Sulmoni (born 1986), Swiss defender
Fulvio Tesorieri (died 1616), Roman Catholic prelate, Bishop of Belcastro (1612–1616)
Fulvio Testi (1593–1646), Italian diplomat and poet
Fulvio Tomizza (1935–1999), Italian language writer
Fulvio Valbusa (born 1969), Italian cross country skier
Fulvio Wetzl (born 1953), Italian filmmaker
Fulvio Zanardini, astronomer, discoverer of two minor planets

See also
11465 Fulvio, minor planet

Italian masculine given names